State Highway 305 (SH 305) is a Texas state highway that runs from just east of Darrouzett south to Glazier in the far northeastern Texas Panhandle.  This route was designated in 1938.

Route description
SH 305 begins at a junction with US 60 and FM 2758.  It heads north from this junction to an intersection with SH 213.  The highway continues to the north to an intersection with FM 1920.  Heading towards the north, the highway continues to an intersection Spur 108 in Lipscomb.  The highway continues to the north to an intersection with FM 2172.  SH 305 reaches its northern terminus at SH 15.

History
TX 305 was designated on December 1, 1938, in its general present location. The number was not assigned until January 23, 1939. The highway was lengthened on September 1, 1988, due to the removal of the concurrency with SH 213.

Junction list

References

Transportation in Hemphill County, Texas
Transportation in Lipscomb County, Texas
305